Tomaš may refer to:

 Tomaš, Croatia, a village near Bjelovar
 Tomaš (surname), Croatian surname